Symmerista zacualpana is a species of moth in the family Notodontidae (the prominents). It was first described by Max Wilhelm Karl Draudt in 1932 and it is found in North America.

The MONA or Hodges number for Symmerista zacualpana is 7955.

References

Further reading

 
 
 

Notodontidae
Articles created by Qbugbot
Moths described in 1932